Brad Craddock (born 24 June 1992) is an Australian-born American football placekicker who is currently a free agent. He played college football for the University of Maryland, College Park.

Early life 
Brad Craddock was born in Adelaide to Raymond and Leonie Craddock. He attended  Emmaus Christian College  He began learning to punt at the age of 8 while playing Australian rules football. Craddock attended OzPunt, a developmental program for aspiring punters, placekickers, and holders in American football. He left the program with a 4.5/5 rating and as the top kicking prospect in Australia in 2012.  Craddock enrolled in the University of Maryland soon after graduating the program.

College career 
Instead, he was moved to the position of placekicker. As a result, he encountered many difficulties in his first year with the team. He finished the season with only 10 of 16 field goals made, posting a 62.5 success rate, and 3 of 5 successful attempts at field goals beyond , including one from beyond . He also handled kickoff duties for the Terrapins.

Under the tutelage of former Pro Bowl kicker and Baltimore Ravens player Matt Stover, Craddock's stats improved greatly in his second season with the Terrapins.

Craddock entered the Big Ten along with the Terrapins. In a game against Pennsylvania State University, Craddock kicked a  field goal with less than a minute to go for the Terrapins to take the lead. The Terrapins won 20–19 and became bowl-eligible. After the kick, Maryland head coach Randy Edsall summarized the game with one quote, "Let the rivalry begin." He finished the year having made 18 of 19 field goals for a 94.7 percent success rate. Craddock earned national recognition as a 2nd team All American award, and received the Lou Groza Award, awarded annually to the United States's most effective collegiate placekicker.

Records 
In his three years of collegiate football, Craddock has accrued several records. As of 2014, he has scored the most consecutive field goals in the history of the Maryland Terrapins and the entire Big Ten Conference (24 field goals), as well as the longest field goal in Terrapins history ( against Ohio State University). Craddock also recorded the highest per-season conversion rate in the school's history (94.7%) as well as the highest career field goal conversion rate (81.7%).

Professional career
After going unselected in the 2016 NFL draft, Craddock signed with the Cleveland Browns on 5 May 2016.

Personal life 
Brad Craddock has two siblings: Alanah and Jacqui. He majored in agricultural and resource economics with a focus on agribusiness.

Craddock grew up in his home town of Adelaide, Australia, the namesake of his nickname, The Adelaide Kid.

Statistics
Through the end of the 2014 regular season, Craddock's statistics are as follows:

References

External links
 Maryland profile

Living people
American football placekickers
American football punters
Maryland Terrapins football players
All-American college football players
Australian players of American football
Sportspeople from Adelaide
Cleveland Browns players
1992 births
Australian expatriate sportspeople in the United States